The women's cross-country eliminator in the 2012 UCI Mountain Bike & Trials World Championships was held on 9 September 2012. Alexandra Engen of Sweden won the event before Jolanda Neff of Switzerland and Aeksandra Dawidowicz of Poland.

Round of 32

Heat 1

Heat 2

Heat 3

Heat 4

Heat 5

Heat 6

Heat 7

Heat 8

Quarterfinals

Quarterfinal 1

Quarterfinal 2

Quarterfinal 3

Quarterfinal 4

Semifinals

Semifinal 1

Semifinal 2

Finals

Big Final

Small Final

References

2012 in mountain biking
2012 UCI Mountain Bike & Trials World Championships
UCI